Godspeed Into The Mainstream is the first studio album by Danish electronic rock band Spleen United.

Track listing
All tracks written by B. Parbo Niemann, except 'Heroin Unltd', 'Peak Fitness Condition' and 'She Falls In Love With Machines' written by B. Parbo Niemann and G. Parbo Niemann

 "Heroin Unltd"  – 4:29
 "In Peak Fitness Condition"  – 3:52
 "Gold Ring"  – 7:44
 "Come On Figures"  – 5:28
 "Spleen Utd"  – 2:31
 "Into The Future"  – 6:07
 "She Falls In Love With Machines"  – 4:23
 "Streetfighter"  – 6:19
 "Godspeed Into The Mainstream"  – 8:20

Singles

 "In Peak Fitness Condition"  – 3:52, Released August 27, 2005
 "Spleen Utd."  – 2:46, Released March 6, 2006

2005 debut albums
Spleen United albums